The Oracle Cluster File System (OCFS, in its second version OCFS2) is a shared disk file system developed by Oracle Corporation and released under the GNU General Public License.
The first version of OCFS was developed with the main focus to accommodate Oracle's database management system that used cluster computing. Because of that it was not a POSIX-compliant file system. With version 2 the POSIX features were included.

OCFS2 (version 2) was integrated into the version 2.6.16 of Linux kernel. Initially, it was marked as "experimental" (Alpha-test) code. This restriction was removed in Linux version 2.6.19. With kernel version 2.6.29 in late 2008, more features were included into ocfs2, such as access control lists and quotas.

OCFS2 used a distributed lock manager which resembles the OpenVMS DLM but is much simpler.
Oracle announced version 1.6 in November 2010 which included a copy on write feature called reflink.

See also

 GlusterFS
 GFS2
 General Parallel File System (GPFS)
 List of file systems
 Lustre (file system)
 MooseFS
 QFS

Notes and references

External links
OCFS2 project page
OCFS project page

Shared disk file systems
Oracle software
Distributed file systems supported by the Linux kernel